Hollywood is an album of the French singer Johnny Hallyday album. It was recorded and mixed by Robert Margouleff.

Track listing

Le bon temps du rock'n'roll ("Old Time Rock and Roll")
 Tout m'enchaîne ("Crying Shame")
Tu n'es pas la seul fille au monde ("You are the Only One I Ever Needed")
Le coeur comme une montagne ("Isn't it Time")
 Ce que tu as fait de moi 
 Fais ce que je dis pas ce que je fais
 Dommage ("I Need You So Badly")
Comme un voleur ("You're Gonna Get What's Coming")
Du même coté de la rivière
T'as le bonjour de l'amour ("You Can Get It If You Really Want")
Source: À Partir de Maintenant track listing

References

1979 albums
Johnny Hallyday albums
Philips Records albums